Djélébou  is a commune in the Cercle of Kayes in the Kayes Region of south-western Mali. The principal town (chef-lieu) is Aourou. In 2009 the commune had a population of 24,674.

References

External links
.

Communes of Kayes Region